Mid90s (stylized as mid90s) is a 2018 American coming-of-age comedy-drama film written and directed by Jonah Hill, in his feature directorial debut, inspired by Hill's own childhood in the mid-1990s. It stars Sunny Suljic, Lucas Hedges and Katherine Waterston, and follows a 13-year-old boy who begins spending time with a mostly older group of skateboarders while living in 1990s Los Angeles.

The film had its world premiere at the Toronto International Film Festival on September 9, 2018, and was theatrically released in the United States on October 19, 2018, by A24. It was well received by critics, who called it a "promising first outing for Hill", and praised the sense of nostalgia.

Plot
In 1996, 13-year-old Stevie lives in Palms, Los Angeles with his abusive and borderline psychopathic older brother Ian and single mother Dabney. One day, Stevie bikes past Motor Avenue Skateshop, admires the boastful camaraderie of the skateboarders outside, and returns the following day. Back home, he trades with his brother for a skateboard, brings it to the shop and befriends young skater Ruben, who introduces him to the rest of the group: charismatic leader Ray, loudmouth "Fuckshit", and quiet "Fourth Grade". Although an inexperienced skater, Stevie is drawn to the group and aspires to imitate their daredevil behavior and anti-social attitudes. Stevie is nicknamed "Sunburn" by Ray during a conversation, and his acceptance into the group causes Ruben to resent him.

While attempting a skateboard trick across an open section between two rooftops, Stevie falls and suffers a head injury. Dabney becomes concerned about his turn towards recklessness and his new friends, but Stevie has already made up his mind that he is sticking with the group. Ian has a tense standoff with Fuckshit as Stevie watches, but Ian appears intimidated by the group and leaves before a fight can break out. Stevie begins smoking, drinking, and experimenting with marijuana. At a party, he has his first sexual experience with a girl named Estee.

After Stevie comes home intoxicated, he and Ian get into a violent fight. Ian has an emotional breakdown when Stevie says that he has no friends and, following the conflict, a distressed Stevie attempts to asphyxiate himself with a cord from a Super NES controller, one of several self-harm incidents. The next day, Dabney forbids Stevie from hanging out with the boys. Stevie lashes out and refuses to obey. Having alienated his mother and brother, Stevie sits alone behind the skate shop. Ray consoles Stevie, telling him that even though he thinks his life is bad, the other boys have it worse: Fourth Grade is poor to the point of not being able to afford socks, Ruben's mom is an abusive drug addict, Fuckshit's reckless partying is worsening, and Ray lost his younger brother, who was hit by a car a few years prior. Ray then takes Stevie out to skate at night, and they fall asleep outside the Santa Monica Courthouse.

The shop hosts a party in back of the store. Ray hopes to make a career in skating, and chats up two professionals as potential sponsors. Fuckshit, who is drunk and high, tries to sabotage Ray's chances by embarrassing him in front of the pros. Stevie, who has been drinking heavily, is provoked into a brawl with Ruben. Discouraged by the undisciplined behavior of his friends, Ray tells everyone to go home. However, an intoxicated Fuckshit insists on driving the group to another party. After some convincing, Ray reluctantly agrees, and the group heads off. Talking animatedly and driving inattentively, Fuckshit crashes and flips the car on its side. Stevie is knocked unconscious and is rushed to the hospital.

Stevie later awakens in a hospital bed, and sees Ian in a chair alongside him. Ian gives Stevie a container of orange juice to comfort him. Dabney enters the hospital and sees Stevie's friends, asleep in the waiting room. Moved by the fact they are there for Stevie, Dabney encourages them to visit Stevie's room. They appear willing to reconcile with each other after the previous night's events. Fourth Grade, who has been filming their adventures throughout the film, says he has something to show them. He plugs his camera into a TV to play them a skate video of their daily activities. Fourth Grade has titled the film "Mid90s".

Cast
 Sunny Suljic as Stevie "Sunburn"
 Na-Kel Smith as Ray
 Olan Prenatt as Fuckshit
 Lucas Hedges as Ian, Stevie's abusive older brother
 Katherine Waterston as Dabney, Ian and Stevie's mother
 Gio Galicia as Ruben
 Ryder McLaughlin as Fourth Grade
 Alexa Demie as Estee
Additionally, Jerrod Carmichael cameos as a security guard whom Stevie and his friends taunt. Filmmaker Harmony Korine appears briefly as a sexual partner of Dabney. Korine wrote the screenplay for the 1995 film Kids, which Hill cited as the reason for his cameo appearance. Hip-hop artist Del the Funky Homosapien and professional skateboarder Chad Muska appear as homeless man #1 and #2 respectively.

Production
On March 30, 2016, it was announced that Jonah Hill would be making his directorial debut from his own spec script, Mid90s, a film he would not appear in.

In March 2017, Lucas Hedges joined the cast. In July 2017, it was reported that Katherine Waterston had signed on and that Sunny Suljic was cast in the lead role. It was also revealed that principal production on the film had commenced. On August 1, 2017, Alexa Demie joined the cast.

Music

Mid90s features an original score by Trent Reznor and Atticus Ross, as well as recordings by Pixies, Morrissey, Herbie Hancock, ESG, the Mamas and the Papas, Souls of Mischief, Nirvana, The Pharcyde, and various 1990s hip hop music.

Release
Mid90s had its world premiere at the Toronto International Film Festival on September 9, 2018, and was also screened at the New York Film Festival on October 7, 2018. It was theatrically released in the United States on October 19, 2018, in limited engagements, with a wide release the following weekend. The film was released in UK and Irish cinemas on April 12, 2019.

Home media
Mid90s was released on DVD and Blu-ray on January 8, 2019.

Reception

Box office
Mid90s grossed $249,500 from four theaters in its opening weekend for an average of $62,375 per venue, good for the third best of 2018. It expanded to 1,206 theaters the following week and made $3 million, finishing 10th at the box office. In its third weekend of release the film made $1.36 million.

Critical response
The website's critical consensus reads, "Mid90s tells a clear-eyed yet nostalgic coming-of-age tale that might mark the start of an auspicious new career for debuting writer-director Jonah Hill." On Metacritic, the film has a weighted average score of 66 out of 100, based on 45 critics, indicating "generally favorable reviews". Audiences polled by PostTrak gave the film an 83% overall positive score and a 62% "definite recommend".

Owen Gleiberman of Variety called the film "a coming-of-age tale that's unvarnished enough to believe," specifying, "the fact that a star like Hill built this movie from the ground up, and did it with so much integrity and flair, lends it an undeniable hipster quotient." Writing for The Hollywood Reporter, John DeFore said, "in emotional punch and shoulda-seen-this-coming skill, it is more like Hill's Lady Bird, a gem that feels simultaneously informed by its author's adolescence and the product of a serious artist's observational distance."

Michael Phillips of the Chicago Tribune gave the film 2 out of 4 stars and said, "Vivid in bits and pieces, Mid90s feels like a research scrapbook for a movie, not a movie. The more Hill throws you around in the name of creating a harsh, immediate impression, the more the impressions blur. Hill will make far better pictures: As an actor, it took him a few films after Superbad to discover the payoff in doing less, and less obviously. The director in him may need another project to figure that out, whatever story he tells next."

More critical reviews called attention to the film's use of homophobic and racist slurs, as well as its treatment of toxic masculinity. Sam Adams of Slate wrote, "The skaters’ dialogue is liberally spiced with homophobic and occasional racist slurs, and while anyone old enough to remember the 1990s can attest to the accuracy of their omnipresence, the movie’s inclusion of them feels like another cheap shortcut to verisimilitude." Other criticisms cited a scene of juvenile sexuality between Stevie and Estee (the character portrayed by Alexa Demie) for its uncomfortable undertones given the ages of the characters and actors.

Hill commented, "The point of the movie is that nothing's black or white. I'm not a moralist; I'm not here to tell an audience how they should feel. I think the way [the characters] speak about women and gay people is really a messed-up way to go about that. And then at the end of the film, they still are there for one another. So I don't think anyone is purely good or purely bad. I hope to create complex characters that constantly are challenging what you think of them."

Accolades

References

External links
 

A24 (company) films
American coming-of-age comedy-drama films
Skateboarding films
2010s coming-of-age comedy-drama films
2018 directorial debut films
2018 independent films
Films produced by Jonah Hill
Films produced by Scott Rudin
Films scored by Trent Reznor
Films scored by Atticus Ross
Films about drugs
Films set in the 1990s
Films set in 1996
Films set in Los Angeles
Hood films
Films shot in Los Angeles
Films with screenplays by Jonah Hill
2018 comedy-drama films
Films about brothers
2010s English-language films
2010s American films